Marina De Oliveira Sena (born  26 September 1996) is a Brazilian singer-songwriter.

Biography
Born in Taiobeiras, Sena started composing music at 15 years old, and at 17 years old she was a contestant of The Voice Brasil. She started her professional career in 2015, as the vocalist of the band A Outra Banda da Lua, with whom she released an album and an EP.

After being a member of the short-lived group Rosa Neon, in 2021 she recorded her first solo album, De Primeira, launched by the single "Me Toca". In 2021 she won three Multishow Brazilian Music Awards for revelation artist of the year, best experimental artist and best album. In 2022 she was nominated for two Latin Grammy Awards, for Portuguese Language Contemporary Pop Album and Best Portuguese Language Song ("Por Supuesto").

Discography

Studio albums 
 2021 – De primeira
 2023 – MS2

Singles 
 2019 – Ombrim (with Rosa Neon and Baka!)
 2020 – Tela 2.0 (with Baka! and Julio Secchin)
 2021 – Me toca
 2021 – +1 minuto (with Jean Tassy and Iuri Rio Branco)
 2021 – Voltei pra mim
 2021 – Te vi na rua (with Silva and RDD)
 2022 – Quente e colorido (with Illy)
 2022 – Foi match (with Hitmaker)
 2022 – Veja baby (with Lagum)

 Featurings 
 2019 – Aceso (Gabriela Viegas feat. Marina Sena)
 2020 – Checklist (Velejante feat. Marina Sena)
 2022 –"Se eu não lembrar" (BK' feat. Marina Sena) 
 2022 –"Apenas um Neném" 	 (Gloria Groove feat. Marina Sena)

With A Outra Banda da Lua 
 2020 – A Outra Banda da Lua
 2021 – Catapoeira (EP)

References

External links 

 
 

1996 births
Living people
People from Minas Gerais
Brazilian singer-songwriters 
Música Popular Brasileira singers
21st-century Brazilian singers
21st-century Brazilian women singers
Women in Latin music